William Patrick Callahan (born June 17, 1950) is an American prelate of the Roman Catholic Church who has served as bishop of the Diocese of La Crosse in Wisconsin since 2010.

Callahan previously served as an auxiliary bishop of the Archdiocese of Milwaukee in Wisconsin. After the  archbishop of Milwaukee, Timothy Dolan, was named Archbishop of New York, Callahan was elected the apostolic administrator of the Archdiocese of Milwaukee, serving until November 14, 2009.

Biography

Early life and education
William Callahan was born in Chicago, Illinois, to William and Ellen Callahan. The youngest of four children, he has two sisters, Roberta and JoAnn, and one brother, Jerry. William Callahan attended St. Mary of Perpetual Help Church as a child.Callahan intended to enter Archbishop Quigley Preparatory Seminary in Chicago after his graduation from grade school, but was denied admission. He instead studied at the Franciscan-run St. Mary Minor Seminary in Crystal Lake, Illinois, from 1964 to 1968, and then at junior college in Chicago until 1969.

In 1969, Callahan entered the novitiate of the Conventual Franciscans in Lake Forest, Illinois. He made his profession as a member of the Franciscans on August 11, 1970. From 1970 to 1973, Callahan attended Loyola University Chicago, obtaining a bachelor degree in radio and television communications. He earned a Master of Divinity degree from St. Michael's College at the University of Toronto in 1976.

Ordination and ministry
Callahan was ordained to the priesthood by Archbishop William Cousins on April 30, 1977. He was then assigned to the Archdiocese of Milwaukee, where he served as curate at the Basilica of St. Josaphat from 1977 to 1978.

Returning to Illinois, Callahan served as director of vocations for the Conventual Franciscans from 1978 to 1984. He was associate pastor (1984–1987) and later pastor (1987–1994) at Holy Family Parish in Peoria, Illinois. He was named rector and pastor of the Basilica of St. Josaphat in 1994, and oversaw the basilica's $7.5 million restoration, which earned him a reputation as an able fundraiser. In 2005, Callahan was named spiritual director of the Pontifical North American College in Rome.

Auxiliary Bishop of Milwaukee

On October 30, 2007, Callahan was appointed as an auxiliary bishop of the Archdiocese of Milwaukee and titular bishop of Lares by Pope Benedict XVI. Callahan received his episcopal consecration on December 21, 2007 from Archbishop Timothy M. Dolan.  His co-consecrators were Bishop Richard J. Sklba and Archbishop John Myers.

Callahan is the first Conventual Franciscan ever to become a bishop in the United States, and the first auxiliary bishop to be named to the Archdiocese of Milwaukee since 1979. Following Dolan's appointment as archbishop of the Archdiocese of New York in February 2009, Callahan was elected as the diocesan administrator of Milwaukee on April 20, 2009. He oversaw the daily administration of the archdiocese until Pope Benedict XVI named Bishop Listecki as the new archbishop of Milwaukee in November 2009.

Bishop of La Crosse
On June 11, 2010, Callahan was appointed Bishop of La Crosse by Pope Benedict XVI, succeeding Bishop Listecki. On August 11, 2010, Callahan was installed as bishop. 

In July 2021, Callahan issued a decree for the removal of Father James Altman as pastor of St. James the Less Parish.

See also

 Catholic Church hierarchy
 Catholic Church in the United States
 Historical list of the Catholic bishops of the United States
 List of Catholic bishops of the United States
 Lists of patriarchs, archbishops, and bishops

References

External links
Roman Catholic Diocese of La Crosse
Roman Catholic Archdiocese of Milwaukee

1950 births
Living people
Clergy from Chicago
Conventual Franciscan bishops
American Roman Catholic clergy of Irish descent
Religious leaders from Milwaukee
Loyola University Chicago alumni
21st-century Roman Catholic bishops in the United States
Roman Catholic Archdiocese of Milwaukee
Roman Catholic bishops of La Crosse
Catholics from Illinois